The 1953 All-Ireland Junior Hurling Championship was the 32nd staging of the All-Ireland Junior Championship since its establishment by the Gaelic Athletic Association in 1912.

Meath entered the championship as the defending champions, however, they were beaten in the Leinster Junior Championship.

The All-Ireland final was played on 10 October 1953 at the Athletic Grounds in Cork, between Cork and Lancashire, in what was their first ever meeting in the final. Cork won the match by 1–11 to 1–04 to claim their second championship title overall and a first tile since 1951.

Results

All-Ireland Junior Football Championship

All-Ireland semi-finals

All-Ireland home final

All-Ireland final

References

Junior
All-Ireland Junior Football Championship